Fernando García (born 18 April 1935) is a Filipino sportsperson who competed in wrestling and judo. He competed in two wrestling events at the 1964 Summer Olympics and in two judo events at the 1972 Summer Olympics.

References

External links
 

1935 births
Living people
Filipino male judoka
Filipino male sport wrestlers
Olympic judoka of the Philippines
Olympic wrestlers of the Philippines
Judoka at the 1972 Summer Olympics
Wrestlers at the 1964 Summer Olympics
Place of birth missing (living people)
Wrestlers at the 1962 Asian Games
Wrestlers at the 1974 Asian Games
Asian Games competitors for the Philippines